Venezuela is a federation made up of twenty-three states, and each has a separate coat of arms. Federal Dependencies of Venezuela are only using a flag.

Gallery

Coat of arms of Caracas

See also 

Coat of arms of Venezuela

References 

 Coats of arms
Venezuela